Anne Rogers Clark (born January 6, 1929, Flushing, New York – died  December 20, 2006, Wilmington, Delaware) was an American dog breeder and trainer and one of the few people licensed to judge all 165 breeds and varieties recognized by the American Kennel Club.

She was the first woman to win best in show at the Westminster Kennel Club Dog Show as a professional handler, and she tied for second there among all handlers with three best in shows. Her 22 judging appearances at Westminster matched the record.

Background
Anne Hone Rogers, the daughter of William and Olga Rogers, was raised in Mahopac, New York. She stood over 6 feet tall for most of her adult life. Her mother, Olga Hone Rogers, a successful canine importer, breeder and exhibitor, ran a kennel in Pound Ridge, New York.

After graduating from high school, Anne Rogers started a successful dog department at Abercrombie & Fitch, then opened a dog grooming service in Manhattan. She won her first best in show at Westminster in 1956.

Writings
She co-authored The International Encyclopedia of Dogs and a fixture at the Westminster Kennel Club Dog Show since 1941.

Documentary film appearance
Clark appeared in the documentary film Wiener Takes All.

Death
She died from kidney failure associated with colon cancer, aged 77, in Wilmington, Delaware. She was predeceased by her husband, James Edward Clark.

References

External links
 
 Profile at Westminster Kennel Club website
 Obituary, San Diego Union Tribune, Anne Rogers Clark; luminary of dog show circuit; 77

1929 births
2006 deaths
Deaths from cancer in Delaware
Dog breeders
Dog trainers
People from Sussex County, Delaware
People from Wilmington, Delaware
People from Mahopac, New York
People from Flushing, Queens
People from Pound Ridge, New York
Deaths from kidney failure
Deaths from colorectal cancer